Fort Harney was a United States Army outpost in eastern Oregon in the United States.  It was named in honor of Brigadier General William S. Harney.  Fort Harney was used as a supply depot and administrative headquarters from 1867 to 1880 during the Army's campaign against Northern Paiute bands in Eastern Oregon and the Bannock uprising in the same area. Today, nothing remains of Fort Harney except a small cemetery.

Camp Harney 

In 1864, the Army had begun using a site along Rattlesnake Creek, in what is now Harney County, Oregon, for temporary supply drops.  The site was unofficially known as Rattlesnake Camp.  As civilian wagon trains passing through eastern Oregon increased and the number of miners in the area grew, the demand for protection from Native American raiding parties required the Army to establish a number of permanent outposts in eastern Oregon.  Rattlesnake Creek was located near the center of eastern Oregon, making it an ideal place for a military supply depot and administrative headquarters.  The Army established a permanent outpost near the mouth of Rattlesnake Creek on 16 August 1867.

The post was originally called Camp Steele.  However, Major General Henry W. Halleck, commander of the Military Department of the Pacific at the time, disapproved the Camp Steele name and suggested the camp be named in honor of Brigadier General William S. Harney who commanded the Army's Department of Oregon in 1858 and 1859.  Based on General Halleck's recommendation, the post was officially designated Camp Harney on 14 September 1867.  The first unit to man Camp Harney was Company K of the 23rd Infantry Regiment.

Military campaigns 

In 1867 and 1868, General George Crook led companies from the 1st Cavalry Regiment and 8th Cavalry Regiment, mounted infantry from the 9th Infantry Regiment and 23rd Infantry Regiment, and Indian scouts from the Wasco and Warm Springs tribes in a successful campaign against Northern Paiute bands in eastern Oregon and northern California.  This was part of the conflict known as the Snake War.  Camp Harney was one of the outposts used to resupply Crook's troops during the campaign.

  The Indian raids in eastern Oregon ended in 1869 after a treaty was signed by General Crook and Wewawewa, the chief of the area's dominant Paiute band.  The treaty signing ceremony was held at Fort Harney.  In 1872, the local Paiute bands were settled on a  reservation north of Malheur Lake in eastern Oregon.  Camp Harney was within the reservation boundary.  The camp housed Army troops assigned to guard the reservation from white trespassers and to keep the Paiutes from leaving.  Despite the Army's presence, white settlers used reservation lands for grazing.  That unchecked encroachment helped ignite the Bannock War in 1878.

During the Bannock War, Camp Harney once again served as an important Army supply depot and military headquarters. The camp was in the center of the conflict area and several newspapers reported that Camp Harney was in imminent danger of being overrun by Native American warriors. However, the United States Army forces under General Oliver O. Howard quickly defeated the Bannocks and Paiutes engaged in the uprising. By January 1879, there were 543 Bannock and Paiute prisoners being held at Camp Harney.

The Army officially changed the name of the post to Fort Harney on 5 April 1879.  However, without a reservation to guard, there was no reason to maintain the post.  As a result, Fort Harney was abandoned on 13 June 1880.  On 13 September 1982, the Malheur reservation lands were officially returned to the public domain except for the  Fort Harney site which was retained by the Army.  The Army returned the  parcel to the public domain on 2 March 1889.  After the fort was abandoned, local settlers dismantled the buildings, using much of the materiel to build up the nearby town of Harney City.  Today, nothing remains of Fort Harney except a small cemetery.

Fort infrastructure 

In 1867, Camp Harney was busy and growing rapidly. The fort structures were built on a flat west of Rattlesnake Creek between steep ridges that flanked the stream. North of the site there were stands of pine that supplied the camp's sawmill with timber.

By 1877, Camp Harney was a well-developed frontier outpost.  It had a large parade ground oriented north and south with a headquarters building and guardhouses.  There was a home for the commanding officer plus five additional officers' quarters, two were log structures and three were frame buildings.  There were three log barracks building for enlisted troops plus four log houses for enlisted men with families.  To feed the men, the camp had mess halls, kitchens, a bakery, and a slaughter house to provide fresh meat.  There were quartermaster's storehouses, a military commissary, a hospital, and a sawmill.  The post also had a blacksmith shop and stables for 150 horses.  In addition to the Army troops, the post had four civilian clerks, two masons, one saddlemaker, a shoemaker, a painter, a baker, and four laundry maids.

Location 

The Fort Harney site is located on private property about two miles (3 km) north of the Harney City town site.

References

External links 
 Oregon History: Civil War in Oregon

Buildings and structures in Harney County, Oregon
Closed installations of the United States Army
Harney
1867 establishments in Oregon
1880 disestablishments in Oregon
Military installations established in 1867
Military installations closed in 1880